Maharathi is a 2007 Indian Telugu-language action drama film produced by Vakada Appa Rao on Sri Lalitha Kalanjali Productions banner and directed by P. Vasu. Starring Nandamuri Balakrishna in lead role. Jaya Prada, Meera Jasmine, Sneha, Naresh and Kovai Sarala appeared in other vital supporting roles and music composed by Guru Kiran. The film recorded as flop at box office.

Plot
Bala works as a music teacher in the college of Naresh Chowdary. His look-alike Krishna Sarala Subrahmani a.k.a Krishna works as a dance master in Chamundeshwari's college. Naresh's daughter Kalyani gradually falls in love with Krishna with the help of Bala. Krishna woos her and makes her fall in love with him but her love is rejected by her father Naresh. She pleads with him to accept her love but he remains unconvinced, enraged by this Kalyani locks herself in a room and demands Naresh Chowdary to bring Krishna to her. Then Bala convinces and advises Naresh Chowdary to meet Krishna and tells him to talk to Krishna. When Naresh Chowdary comes to learn that Krishna is working as a dance teacher in Chamundeswari's college he gets shocked and reveals that Chamundeswari is none other than her wife who was separated from him long back when Kalyani was a 2-year-old baby. Left with no choice Naresh Chowdary approaches Chamundeswari and requests her to convince Krishna to marry their daughter Kalyani. She agrees to this and both meet Krishna. Naresh Chowdary gets shocked after seeing Krishna as he looks exactly like his music teacher Bala. When Chamundeswari asks Krishna to marry his daughter he rejects their offer to their shock and starts acting as Bala. Naresh Chowdary finds this behavior and tells Chamundeswari that this Krishna is the one who worked as a music teacher in his college. When questioned about this, Krishna finally agrees to this telling them that he acted as Bala and reveals an unknown thing to them that he is neither Krishna nor Bala but Balayya.

Balayya is an uneducated simple guy who lives with his mother Saralamma in Visakhapatnam. A dance researcher Bhairavi comes to Visakhapatnam and starts making research on Balayya. In the process, Bhairavi falls in love with him. She makes him love her and change his lifestyle. Bhairavi tells about her love for her mother who is none other than Chamundeswari and she accepts her love but tries to stop the marriage somehow. Chamundeswari meets Saralamma and takes her to the marriage function hall and insults her. Pained by this, Saralamma goes missing. Balayya and Bhairavi both worry and start finding Saralamma. In the meanwhile, Chamundeswari tells Bhairavi about the marriage function hall she was taking care of for her marriage. They finally find her dead in a hospital. They come to know that Saralamma suicide herself after getting insulted by Chamundeswari before the marriage function hall. Bhairavi doubts this and feels her mother Chamundeswari was the reason behind her death and questions the same to her and when Chamundeswari tells her that she didn't like her to marry her to Balayya, Bhairavi out of remorse and shame kills herself as a punishment to Chamundeswari for being the reason for Saralamma's death. Balayya is left with no one, loses his mind, starts roaming, and after some time decides to teach Chamundeswari a lesson for her arrogance.

Now, Chamundeswari after listening to this finally apologizes for her acts and Balayya forgives her and unites Naresh Chowdary and her. Balayya then goes to Kalyani and accepts her love.

Cast

 Balakrishna as Bala / Krishna Sarala Subrahmani / Balayya
 Jaya Prada as Chamundeshwari
 Meera Jasmine as Kalyani
 Sneha as Bhairavi
 Navaneet Kaur
 Pradeep Rawat 
 Jaya Prakash Reddy 
 Naresh 
 Venu Madhav 
 Ali 
 Thotapalli Madhu 
 Sudeepa Pinky
 Satyam Rajesh 
 Srinivasa Reddy 
 Ping Pong Surya 
 Chittajalu Lakshmipati
 Suthi Velu 
 Rallapalli 
 Subbaraya Sharma 
 KK Sarma 
 Ananth 
 Gautam Raju
 Ashok Kumar
 Kadambari Kiran 
 Garimalla Viswaswara Rao
 Kovai Sarala
 Vijaya Singh 
 Rajitha
 Geetha Singh 
 Vanaja

Soundtrack

Music was composed by Gurukiran.

References

External links

2007 films
2000s Telugu-language films
Films directed by P. Vasu
Films scored by Gurukiran